The Yellow Expedition was a French trans-Asian expedition in 1931/1932. It was organized by Citroën in order to promote their P17 Kégresse track vehicles. The expedition started in Beirut and, the capital of French Lebanon and Beijing, the capital of China. One group traveled westward, the other eastward and both met along the route, where the eastbound group turned back allowing both groups to travel to Beijing along a different route. Georges-Marie Haardt and Louis Audouin-Dubreuil led the cruise. Haardt had already crossed the Sahara and the whole African continent in two ambitious expeditions.

One group of the expedition travelled eastwards through the French Lebanon, French Syria, Kingdom of Iraq under British administration, Persia, Afghanistan, British India until the border of Xinjiang, then a de facto independent region of China under control of the warlord Jin Shuren. Another group travelled westwards across China from Beijing to Urumchi, where they were held hostage by Jin Shuren's troops for several weeks.

The French archeologist Joseph Hackin, the Russian-French painter Alexandre Jacovleff (as an "Artistic Adviser"), the French philosopher Pierre Teilhard de Chardin and the American photographer Maynard Owen Williams participated in the expedition.

Early 1932, the expedition reached the East China Sea. In British Hong Kong, Haardt died of pneumonia and the expedition was aborted.

In 1934, a feature-length documentary of the expedition was released. Claude Delvincourt composed the music for this film.

In the early 1970s, a French-West German co-produced drama depicting the expedition was filmed. During shoots in Turkey, famous British actor Roger Delgado died. Nevertheless, filming continued. The series aired in France in 1974 and in West Germany in 1975.

Literature 
 Ariane Audouin-Dubreuil: La Croisière jaune: Sur la route de la soie, Grenoble 2013. .
 M.-P. Bossard: Quer durch Asien über die alte Seidenstraße, Stuttgart/Zürich 1967. .
 André Citroën/Fabien Sabates/Camille Cravan/Eric Baschet (eds.): Die Gelbe Expedition Beirut-Peking 1931–1932: Eine historische Foto-Reportage, Kehl am Rhein 1979. .
 Georges Le Fèvre: La croisière jaune : expédition Citroën Centre-Asie Haardt, Paris 1991. .
 Georges Le Fèvre: An Eastern Odyssey: The Third Expedition of Haardt and Audouin-Dubreuil, London, Gollancz, 1935. Translated by Major-General Ernest Swinton with a preface by André Citroën.

References 

1931 in Lebanon
1932 in China
Asian expeditions
China–France relations
Exploration of Central Asia
Exploration of South Asia
Exploration of Western Asia
Expeditions from France